Dennis Arthur Copperwheat GC (23 May 1914 – 8 September 1992) of the Royal Navy won the George Cross for the heroism he displayed on 22 March 1942 in scuttling a burning ammunition ship in Valletta harbour, Malta.

George Cross
Following a heavy Luftwaffe air attack on Malta and ships entering Valletta Harbour, Lieutenant Copperwheat (a torpedoes and explosives officer) commanded a squad of men from  sent to scuttle a Norwegian merchantman Talabot (survivor of the convoy MG1), which was laden with ammunition and burning in the busy harbour.

As the men laid scuttling charges, the fires caused ammunition stored on the deck to explode all around them and prevented the charges being laid in the ships hold. Therefore, the charges had to be draped over the sides of the stricken vessel.  The ship lay forty yards from the shore and, as the electric cables required to fire the charges could only just reach the shore, Copperwheat took it upon himself to fire the charges after seeing his men safely to cover.

He was exposed to the full force of the charges he had laid but was successful in sinking the ship. Had the ship been left to burn, the inevitable explosion from the burning ammunition would have caused grievous damage to Valletta's vital harbour. Much of the ammunition from the ship was salvaged and used in the liberation of Italy.

Citation
Notice of Copperwheat's George Cross appeared in the London Gazette on 17 November 1942:

Copperwheat became only one of three men to win the George Cross during the siege of Malta.

References

1914 births
1992 deaths
British recipients of the George Cross
Royal Navy recipients of the George Cross
Royal Navy officers
Royal Navy officers of World War II